Anlong is an H chondrite meteorite that fell to earth on May 2, 1971, in Guizhou, China.

Classification
It is classified as H5-ordinary chondrite.

References

See also 
 Glossary of meteoritics
 Meteorite falls
 Ordinary chondrite

Meteorites found in China
1971 in China